William Hollis Long II (born August 11, 1955) is an American politician and auctioneer who served as the U.S. representative for Missouri's 7th congressional district from 2011 to 2023. The district includes much of the southwestern quadrant of the state and is anchored in Springfield. It also includes Joplin and Branson.

A member of the Republican Party, Long was elected to fill the district's seat in 2010, succeeding Roy Blunt upon his election to the U.S. Senate. After Blunt announced that he would not run for reelection to the Senate in 2022, Long became a candidate in the 2022 race to succeed him, but he lost the Republican primary to Eric Schmitt.

Early life and education 
A fourth-generation native of Missouri, Long was born in Springfield in 1955. He attended the University of Missouri in Columbia, Missouri and was a member of the Delta Upsilon fraternity before dropping out. After taking time off from school for three years, Long attended a nine-day training program at the Missouri Auction School in Kansas City. He received his Certified Auctioneer designation via the National Auctioneers Association.

Career 
Long owned Billy Long Auctions, LLC. He was also a talk radio show host on the Springfield-based station KWTO. He is a member of the National Association of Realtors, National Auctioneers Association, the Springfield Area Chamber of Commerce, the National Rifle Association, and the Greater Springfield Board of Realtors.

During a September 2018 House Committee on Energy and Commerce hearing on alleged anti-conservative bias on social media, far-right internet personality Laura Loomer interrupted the meeting. Long began a mock auction chant pretending he was selling Loomer's mobile phone until she was escorted out. The incident generated considerable laughter and applause from the audience.

Long also participated in the World Poker Tour, participating in professional sanctioned games including the Southern Poker Championship at the Beau Rivage and the Bellagio Cup.

In September 2018, in response to sexual assault allegations against Supreme Court nominee Brett Kavanaugh, Long retweeted a Twitter post comparing the allegations to a "kiss on the forehead".

U.S. House of Representatives

2010

Republican primary
Long joined the race for the 7th Congressional District after incumbent U.S. Representative Roy Blunt chose to run for the U.S. Senate seat being vacated by Kit Bond. In the crowded seven-way Republican primary—the de facto election in the state's most Republican district—Long won with 36% of the vote. 

 
 
 
 
 
 
 
 
 
 

General election

2012

2014

In the August 5 Republican primary, Long defeated Marshall Works, 62.4% to 37.6%.

2016

In the August 2 Republican primary, Long defeated Nathan Clay, Christopher Batsche, Matthew Evans, Lyndle Spencer, Matthew Canovi, James Nelson and Mary Byrne.

2018

In the Republican primary, Long defeated Jim Evans, Lance Norris, and Benjamin Holcomb. In the general election, he defeated Democratic nominee Jamie Schoolcraft, who had defeated Kenneth Hatfield, John Farmer de la Torre, and Vincent Jennings in the Democratic primary.

2020

In the August 4 Republican primary, Long defeated Eric Harleman, Kevin VanStory, Steve Chetnik and Camille Lombardi-Olive.

Legislation
Since 2011, Long has sponsored 37 bills, 103 resolutions and 26 concurrent resolution, and co-sponsored 1,258 other pieces of legislation. He also introduced the Agricultural Certainty for Reporting Emissions Act on March 14, 2018, which would amend the Comprehensive Environmental Response, Compensation, and Liability Act of 1980. The bill has not passed the House for further voting in the Senate.

Committee assignments

 Committee on Energy and Commerce
 Subcommittee on Energy and Power
 Subcommittee on Communications and Technology
 Subcommittee on Health

Caucus memberships
 Congressional Arts Caucus
Congressional Constitution Caucus
U.S.-Japan Caucus

Political positions

Immigration
Long supported President Donald Trump's 2017 executive order banning entry to the U.S. to citizens of seven Muslim-majority countries.

Objections to the 2020 election results
After Joe Biden won the 2020 presidential election and Donald Trump refused to concede, Long pushed Trump’s claims of fraud in the election.

In December 2020, Long supported an amicus brief in support of Texas v. Pennsylvania, a lawsuit filed at the United States Supreme Court contesting the results of the 2020 presidential election based on allegations of fraud.

LGBTQ rights 
In 2015, Long condemned the Supreme Court ruling in Obergefell v. Hodges, which held that same-sex marriage bans violated the constitution.

References

External links

 
 
 

|-

1955 births
21st-century American politicians
American auctioneers
Candidates in the 2022 United States Senate elections
Living people
Politicians from Springfield, Missouri
Republican Party members of the United States House of Representatives from Missouri